Songdo Station is a station on the Suin Line of the Seoul Metropolitan Subway system. It was the northwestern terminus, until the Phase 2 extension to Incheon Station became operational on February 27, 2016.

It was originally part of the former narrow-gauge Suin Line, before its closure in 1994. With the conversion and double-tracking of the Suin Line, this station was re-opened in 2012.

References

Metro stations in Incheon
Seoul Metropolitan Subway stations
Railway stations opened in 1937
Yeonsu District